Karl August Ferdinand von Borcke (18 February 1776 – 15 December 1830) was a Prussian general and the first recipient of the Iron Cross.

Biography
Borcke was born in Stargard, Province of Pomerania, Kingdom of Prussia (today Poland) to Ernst Gottlieb Kurt von Borcke (1757–1816) and Anna Margarethe née Greinert (1750–1804). He attended school at Stargard and joined the Prussian Army in 1789 as an officer's cadet. Borcke took part in Napoleon's Russian campaign as a member of the Prussian contingent allied to Napoleon. After Prussia changed sides in 1813 he fought in the battles of Katzbach and Leipzig.
He received the Iron Cross II class for his deployment in a battle at Lüneburg on 21 April 1813, the first to be honored after its foundation by King Frederick William III of Prussia on 10 March 1813. Borcke commanded the Prussian 9th Infantry Brigade of the Third Corps during the Hundred Days Campaign against Napoleon and fought in the battle of Ligny and was then the commander of the Fortress of Luxembourg in 1815.

Borcke was married to Ernestine Johanna Christiane née von Broesigke (1764–1836) since 1806, they had no children. He died in a hunting accident at his hometown.

Honours and awards
 Iron Cross second class (Battle of Lüneburg, 21 April 1813)
 Iron Cross first class (for his part in the Battle of Leipzig)
 Order of the Sword
 Order of St Vladimir (Russia)
 Order of the Red Eagle (1815)

References

1776 births
1830 deaths
People from the Province of Pomerania
Prussian commanders of the Napoleonic Wars
Lieutenant generals of Prussia
German untitled nobility
Hunting accident deaths
People from Stargard
Recipients of the Iron Cross, 1st class
Recipients of the Order of the Sword
Recipients of the Order of St. Vladimir
Recipients of the Iron Cross (1813)
Accidental deaths in Poland
Deaths by firearm in Poland
Firearm accident victims